John Orson Whitaker, Jr. (born December 13, 1959) is an American actor notable for several film and television performances during his childhood. The redheaded Whitaker played Jody Davis on Family Affair from 1966 to 1971. He also originated the role of Scotty Baldwin on General Hospital in 1965, and played the lead in Hallmark's 1969 The Littlest Angel, and portrayed the title character in the 1973 musical version of Tom Sawyer.

Early life
Whitaker was born in the Los Angeles neighborhood of Van Nuys, the fifth of eight children of Thelma and John O. Whitaker, Sr.

Acting career

Whitaker began his professional acting career at the age of three by appearing in a television commercial for a local used-car dealer. He went on to appear in advertisements for Mattel Toymakers, for such toys as Larry the Lion and Crackers the Parrot in their Animal Yackers series. In 1965, Whitaker originated the character of the young Scotty Baldwin in the soap opera General Hospital. In 1966, he acted in a major feature film, The Russians Are Coming, the Russians Are Coming, which also starred Brian Keith. After Keith was cast as the lead in the television series Family Affair, he recommended Whitaker to play the part of his on-screen nephew.

Family Affair aired from 1966 to 1971. It co-starred Whitaker playing the role of an orphaned boy named Jody Davis, living in a high-rise apartment in New York City with his twin sister Buffy (Anissa Jones) and older sister Cissy (Kathy Garver), his bachelor uncle Bill Davis (Brian Keith), and Bill's gentleman's gentleman, Mr. French (Sebastian Cabot). Jody and Buffy were originally supposed to be different ages, but the show's producers thought Whitaker and Jones looked so cute together that they changed them to be twins. While a regular on the show, Whitaker also starred in the Hallmark Hall of Fame production The Littlest Angel alongside Fred Gwynne and Tony Randall, and an episode of the long-running Western The Virginian in 1969.

Also, in 1969, Whitaker was a guest star playing Jack in an episode of Bewitched titled "Samantha and the Beanstalk".  In 1970, Whitaker played the part of Willie in a Green Acres episode titled "The Confrontation". Later, he played Dinky Watson in a Green Acres episode titled "The Beeping Rock".

After Family Affair, he appeared in a two-part episode of Gunsmoke in 1971. Whitaker went on to star in the 1973 Sid and Marty Krofft Saturday morning children's series Sigmund and the Sea Monsters alongside Billy Barty and Scott Kolden, and appeared in feature films, including Disney's Snowball Express (1972), The Biscuit Eater (1972), Napoleon and Samantha (1972), and The Magic Pony (1977). His most prominent feature film role during this period was the lead in the musical version of Tom Sawyer (1973).

In an interview with Tom Snyder on The Late Late Show, Whitaker said he had worked as a computer consultant at CBS. He later joined a Los Angeles talent agency, Whitaker Entertainment, owned by his sister. Whitaker also was Dana Plato's manager.

In 1999, Whitaker received the Young Artist Former Child Star Lifetime Achievement Award at the 20th Youth in Film Awards.

In 2012, Whitaker co-produced and co-hosted a short-lived radio talk show, The Dr. Zod and Johnny Show. The following year, he appeared onstage in Judson Theatre Company's production of To Kill a Mockingbird in the cameo role of Judge Taylor. 

In 2016, Whitaker gave a guest-star cameo appearance in Amazon's reboot of Sigmund and the Sea Monsters. In the premiere episode, he played the part of heckling boat owner Zach, against David Arquette's salty character Captain Barnabas. The episode had a similar cameo appearance by original show creators Sid and Marty Krofft.

Partial filmography

Personal life

Whitaker struggled as an adult with an addiction to drugs and alcohol until his family held an intervention and threatened to cut off contact with him unless he got help. He agreed and joined a twelve-step program; he later became a certified drug counselor and founder of a nonprofit organization for Spanish-speaking addicts. In 2011, he said he had been clean and sober for 13 years.

References

Further reading 

 Holmstrom, John (1996). The Moving Picture Boy: An International Encyclopaedia from 1895 to 1995. Norwich: Michael Russell, p. 329.
 Dye, David (1988). Child and Youth Actors: Filmography of Their Entire Careers, 1914-1985. Jefferson, NC: McFarland & Co., p. 239.

External links

 
 
 
  as 'Johnnie Whitacker'
 

1959 births
Living people
American male film actors
American male child actors
Latter Day Saints from California
American male soap opera actors
American male television actors
Brigham Young University alumni
American Mormon missionaries in Portugal
20th-century Mormon missionaries
Male actors from Los Angeles
People from the San Fernando Valley
People from Van Nuys, Los Angeles